11C, 11-C or 11.C may refer to:

 New York State Route 11C
 GCR Class 11C, a class of British 4-4-0 steam locomotive
 11C, a U.S. Army MOS for a mortarman
 The clockwise bus service on West Midlands bus route 11
 Carbon-11 (11C), an isotope of carbon

See also
 Secondary State Highway 11C (disambiguation)
C11 (disambiguation)